Tai Ping Carpets International Ltd. (Hong Kong HKE, HKex Stock code: 146)  is a global custom carpet company serving the architect and design community. Based in Hong Kong, Tai Ping Carpets operates flagship showrooms in New York City, Shanghai and Paris, as well as proprietary factories, design studios, and showrooms in 100 countries, over four continents.

The company's Residential division includes brands Tai Ping, Edward Fields and La Manufacture Cogolin.

History
Tai Ping was founded in 1956 by a group of seven friends, headed by Sir Lawrence Kadoorie, a prominent businessman and philanthropist.  It began as a project to preserve China's tradition of handmade carpets and to protect a generation of craftspeople fleeing Mainland China.

Shortly after its launch, Anthony Yeh, an engineer and one of the company's directors, developed the world's first motorized hand-tufting gun, which allowed carpets to be made faster and more efficiently, marking a turning point for the company.  Today, the hand-tufting gun is used throughout the industry.

In 1957, Tai Ping opened a showroom in Hong Kong beside The Peninsula Hong Kong Hotel. In 1959, production moved to larger facility in Tai Po in Hong Kong's New Territories, which remained the company headquarters and main factory for the next 32 years.

In the 1970s, the launch of a Paris showroom introduced Tai Ping to an international market, particularly in Europe and Asia. When China began opening up for business, Tai Ping was among the pioneers to establish a factory on the mainland. In 1991 Tai Ping moved all production from Hong Kong to the factory at Nanhai in neighboring Guangdong province, and in 2017 moved production to its newly built, state-of-the-art factory in Xiamen in the Fujian province designed by Paris-based Sandrolini Architecte. The 25,000 square meter Xiamen facility, with over 600 employees, houses the company's extensive archives and yarn stores, as well as production for dyeing, artwork, tufting, and finishing.

In 2005, Tai Ping opened a flagship in New York City, located today in the Flatiron District.

That same year, Tai Ping acquired Edward Fields, an American manufacturer of bespoke carpets. Edward Fields has its own New York City flagship, along with studios operating from Tai Ping showrooms in Chicago, Dallas, Los Angeles, Miami, and San Francisco.

In 2010, Tai Ping purchased La Manufacture Cogolin, the French producer of hand-woven Jacquard carpets, founded by Jean Lauer   in 1924. Under Tai Ping direction, the company's original workshops were restored and a new Paris showroom was opened  in June 2012.

Also in June 2012, Tai Ping launched a new European flagship on Rue Montalembert in Paris  conceived by Belgian born, Paris-based designer Ramy Fischler.

Management and strategic development
In September 2017, Tai Ping sold its commercial business to an independent third party. This sale included the manufacture, distribution and sales of machine-made commercial carpet, and it allowed Tai Ping to focus its operations, marketing and sales efforts on custom-made artisan products for use in homes, yachts and private jets, along with high-end commercial locations such as boutique stores, hotels and corporate offices.

In January 2018, former COO Mark Worgan became Tai Ping's CEO, replacing James H. Kaplan. Other key personnel include CFO Alex Lung, CSO Shawn Hiltz, and Managing Directors for each of Tai Ping's global regions: Tony Ash (Europe, Middle East, Africa), Celia Yeung (Asia) and Michael Reagan (Americas). Nicholas Colfer serves as Chairman.

Products
Tai Ping's custom-tufted products are manufactured in its proprietary factory in Xiamen. The company's hand-knotted carpets are handwoven in independent factories in China and Nepal. Hand-loomed rugs under the Manufacture Cogolin brand are still made on Jacquard looms in France.

Sustainability
Tai Ping holds both Gold and Platinum NSF 140 certifications, 
from the American National Standards Institute ANSI, as well as LEED (Leadership in Energy and Environmental Design) certification. Internally, Tai Ping has implemented Tai Ping Towards Sustainability, (TPTS), a program dedicated to sustainable practices and achievements.

References

External links

Carpet manufacturing companies
Textile companies of China
Companies listed on the Hong Kong Stock Exchange